YTB International, known as YTB Global Travel, Your Travel Biz or YTB, operates a multi-level marketing business through owner-affiliate websites offering travel, excursions, and lodging. The company was founded in 2001 by J. Lloyd Tomer, Scott Tomer, and Kim Sorensen. The company is currently owned by U.S. businessman Sam Hathi of Jamraval, Inc. Other YTB subsidiaries include YTB Travel Network, Inc., Zamzuu, Inc., and REZconnect Technologies, Inc. (2004–2009). YTB is based in Wood River, Illinois. International subsidiaries operate in the U.S., Puerto Rico, the Bahamas, Bermuda, and Canada.

Between 2006 and 2009 the company was the subject of several lawsuits and investigations in California, Illinois, and Rhode Island, alleging the company to be a pyramid scheme and using deceptive marketing. Declining revenues following this led to the company's bankruptcy in 2013, after which it was purchased by Jamraval, Inc. and reorganized under the name YTB Global Travel.

History 
J. Lloyd "Coach" Tomer, his son Scott Tomer, and Kim Sorensen launched YTB in 2001 in Alton, Illinois. In 2004, YTB's founders bought interest in a related company, REZconnect Technologies, and increased their marketing budget. Members were then recruited through videos of successful salespeople. By year's end, the company employed 23 employees with total travel sales reaching $20 million.

In 2007, Royal Caribbean stopped doing business with YTB, describing the company as a "card mill;" an industry term for a business that provides perks that are intended for a limited number of travel agents to the general public.

In 2008 the company was sued by California Attorney General Jerry Brown. An out-of-court settlement required changes to the company's business model, and generated a decrease in membership attributed to bad publicity. In late 2008, YTB laid off 17 employees, a move that was part of a reorganization. In 2008 the company's revenues were $44.8 million. YTB said its independent audit at the end of 2008 expressed "substantial doubt about our company's ability to continue as a going concern", a sentiment the company itself later echoed.

In 2009 the company was operating at a loss of $1.9 million for the first three months of the year. Revenue in that quarter dropped 49% to $21.8 million and then to $18 million in the second quarter. The company's paying members also declined substantially in number, from a high in April 2008 of 138,000 to 60,414 in mid-2009. The decline in revenue led the company to sell several commercial properties it owned in 2009, including the company's Learjet. That year YTB also sold RezConnect, by then its technology and booking arm, to two of RezConnect's officers. Under the terms of the sale, YTB would indemnify the new owners for any YTB-related liabilities.

In 2011 the company sold its headquarters building and adjoining property for $7.6 million. In October 2011, a newly formed company, Sixth Scott LLC began purchasing YTB Travel Network from YTB International. The company was relaunched as First Alliance Travel one year later.

On February 1, 2012, founder J. Kim Sorenson died at the age of 62. In March 2012 the YTB announced a plan to merge with LTS Nutraceutical, another MLM firm. In May, the company began a major restructuring and stated that the President and CEO, Robert Van Patton, had submitted his resignation. In September, YTB called off the merger and announced that founder and chairman Scott Tomer was resigning.

On March 1, 2013 YTB International filed for Chapter 11 protection in federal court in St. Louis. The last quarterly earnings report the company filed was for the third quarter of 2011, although the company later announced that the report contained errors.

On October 11, 2013, YTB completed the sale of its assets to a Chicago-based businessman Sam Hathi of Jamraval, Inc. "We believe the YTB franchise can be turned around and that it can regain the leadership position that it once held in the travel services industry," said Hathi in a statement. Since being acquired YTB has operated as YTB Global Travel. As of March 2, 2015 the company ceased enrolling new agents and representatives, yet still provided resources for existing members.

Business model 

YTB reported having representatives in the United States, Bermuda, the Bahamas, and Canada who sold over $3 billion in travel in the company's first ten years. In 2012, YTB was listed 52nd largest travel agency for Travel Weekly'''s yearly "Power List." YTB Global Travel Inc operated as two companies under the YTB Global Travel Inc. name; YTB Travel Network and YTB Marketing''. 

In YTB Travel Network, representatives purchased an "online travel agency" website from which they could be paid a sales commission. After paying a setup fee and monthly maintenance fee, representatives could sell travel packages online to others, and utilize the website for their own travel purposes. In YTB Marketing, representatives were responsible for recruiting for YTB's representative program. YTB paid a commission or referral fee and tiered compensation to those who participate in the Rep marketing program.

Lawsuits
In August 2008 California Attorney General Jerry Brown sued the company for $25 million, alleging it to be a pyramid scheme, among other claims. The Illinois Better Business Bureau and Illinois Attorney General Lisa Madigan joined Brown in investigating the company. Brown's lawsuit indicates that 45,000 sales reps earned an average of about $90 in 2007 and of their 200,000 total agents, some 125,000 earned nothing and 37,000 earned less than $39. On May 14, 2009, California authorities settled their suit with YTB for $1 million. As part of the settlement, YTB agreed to restructure, possibly hastening a transition to a franchise system. That same day, Madigan filed a similar suit in Illinois.  Brown said the agreement would put an end to the $450, $50 per month unprofitable personalized websites.

Around the same time, several former agents filed a class-action lawsuit alleging the company to be an illegal pyramid scheme. The lawsuit says that the company "claims to sell travel services, but said company's main business is inducing others to become travel agents." YTB responded by stating that it intends to "vigorously defend the case," and the case was dismissed in July 2009 on the grounds that non-residents of Illinois could not pursue the matter under Illinois law. Illinois Attorney General Lisa Madigan, after her office and the Illinois Better Business Bureau, received more than 150 complaints about the company, partnered with Brown's office in his state's investigation of the company. The BBB indicated that 80% of YTB revenue came from new agent recruitment, with agents earning an average of $111 per year, almost $400 less than the initial $499 sign-up price. In May 2011, it was announced that YTB had reached a settlement with the state of Illinois, paying $150,000 in restitution. No admission nor denial of guilt was made in the settlement.

In 2007, YTB was also investigated for similar allegations in Rhode Island.

In defense of YTB, chief executive Scott Tomer said, "We are wholly confident that our business model will withstand scrutiny, and look forward to setting the record straight in court."

References

External links

Companies based in Madison County, Illinois
Online travel agencies
Multi-level marketing companies